Bob Quinn Lake Airport  is located near to Bob Quinn Lake, British Columbia, Canada.

References

External links
 Page about this aerodrome on COPA's Places to Fly airport directory

Registered aerodromes in British Columbia
Regional District of Kitimat–Stikine